El Comandante, is a Colombian television series created by Sony Pictures Television. It is based on the life of the late Venezuelan President, Hugo Rafael Chávez Frias. It stars Andrés Parra as the titular character.

Plot summary 
El Comandante is a story inspired by the life of Hugo Chávez, a man of humble origin who, at only 44 years old and against all odds, became the most powerful and controversial Latin American leader of his time. During his rule he controlled at will the largest oil reserves on the planet, challenged the First World and managed to shake the continent as nobody else.

The production narrates the fictional story of a man and a country, inspired by real events, incorporating elements and characters of fiction as his comrades fighting, the spies who wanted to kill him, the women who accompanied him in his career and the members of the opposition, to offer an account of suspense and action, of politics and romance.

Cast 
 Andrés Parra as Hugo Rafael Chávez Frias
 Gabriela Vergara as Marisabel Rodríguez de Chávez
 Stephanie Cayo as Mónica Zabaleta
 Julián Román as Carlos Uzcátegui
 César Manzano as Manuel Centeno
 Sheila Monterola as Antonia Salcedo
 Jimmy Vásquez as Willy Manzanares 
 Albi De Abreu as Cristóbal Iturbe
 Marianela González as Daniela Vásquez
 Paulina Dávila as Isabel Manrique
 Natalia Reyes as Carolina Jiménez
 Vicente Peña as Ángel Saavedra
 José Narváez as Iván Fonseca
 Viña Machado as Carmen Rondón
 Jorge Rengifo as Yuckson
 Duban Prado as Máikel
 Jeanette Lehr as Adelaida de Chávez "Mamá Laida"
 Jimmy Vásquez as Willy Manzanares
 Francisco Denis as Fernando Brizuela
Franártur Duque as Ángel Saavedra, young

Production 
The production is based on an original idea by the Venezuelan writer and columnist Moisés Naím and the direction is by Felipe Cano (Lady, la vendedora de rosas, El laberinto de Alicia) and Henry Rivero (film En coma). The librettos are by José Luis González, Juan Andrés Granados and Versalia Cordero. The series is produced by Andrea Marulanda and Luis Eduardo Jiménez as executive producers, series production is scheduled for the summer of 2016.

The first advance of the series was revealed on October 25, 2016, showing scenes that marked the life of the Venezuelan president, such as episodes of his childhood in Sabaneta, Barinas state, until the coup attempt he led in 1992.

Casting 
In May 2016, Andrés Parra published in his Twitter account a promotional image of the series next to the phrase "The power of passion and the passion for power". To interpret Chavez, Parra had to practice the Venezuelan accent, and cut his hair to interpret the stage where Chavez suffered from cancer. For the personage of Marisabel Rodríguez de Chávez several Venezuelan actresses made casting such as Wanda D'Isidoro, Eileen Abad, Gaby Spanic and Sonya Smith, later she was chosen Gabriela Vergara to interpret the character. More than 50% of the cast are Venezuelan actors.

Reception
Following heavy promotion of the series in Colombia, The Miami Herald described El Comandante'''s launch as being "in a lackluster sixth place, behind the telenovela Sin Tetas No Hay Paraiso as well as Colombia's Next Top Model and NBC’s Las Vega's''".

Controversy 
In May 2016, Diosdado Cabello was completely opposed to the production of the series, because he would only lend to defaming the former president of Venezuela, thus asking the executives of Sony Pictures Television to stop the production process and show evidence that the Chavez family agreed with such a series. Later, Sony Pictures Television clarified that Asdrúbal Chávez had authorized the production of the series.  Actress Gabriela Vergara received several negative comments towards her character in the series, because Marisabel Rodríguez de Chávez is accused of complicity and robbery during the Chávez government. 
In October 2016, Cabello warned to take legal action against the production company Sony Pictures Television to continue with the production of the series.

Moisés Naím clarified that the series is a series of fiction and not a biography so it will have nothing to do with the reality of Venezuela.

In Venezuela, CONATEL, an institution that regulates airing and broadcasting in the country, ordered to withdraw the signal from RCN Television to prohibit the viewing of the series.

Broadcast 
The series will be released on January 30, 2017 in Colombia on RCN Televisión, while in Latin America it will premiere on January 31, 2017 on TNT. In the United States, it will be transmitted by the network Telemundo.

References

External links 
 

Spanish-language American telenovelas
Sony Pictures Television telenovelas
2017 telenovelas
American telenovelas
Colombian telenovelas
2017 American television series debuts
2017 Colombian television series debuts
2017 Colombian television series endings
2017 American television series endings
Television shows set in Venezuela
Works about Hugo Chávez